A list of Hong Kong films released in 2012:

References

External links
 IMDB list of Hong Kong films 
 Hong Kong films of 2012 at HKcinemamagic.com

2012
Films
Hong Kong